The 2006 Trincomalee Massacre of NGO Workers, also known as the Muttur Massacre, took place on 4 or 5 August 2006, when 17 employees of the French INGO Action Against Hunger (known internationally as , or ACF) were shot at close range in the city of Muttur, Sri Lanka, close to Trincomalee.  The victims included sixteen minority Sri Lankan Tamils and one Sri Lankan Muslim.

Incident
The bodies were discovered after the town of Muttur had come under the control of the government forces. There was fierce fighting between government forces and rebel LTTE forces the previous week prior to the discovery of the bodies.

Reactions

SLMM
The Sri Lankan government denied responsibility but the Sri Lanka Monitoring Mission suspected that the Sri Lankan Army was responsible for the killings. According to the SLMM, " ...  [it] is convinced that there cannot be any other armed groups than the security forces who could actually have been behind the act". The outgoing head of the Mission, the retired Swedish Colonel Ulf Henricsson, said that this was "one of the most serious recent crimes against humanitarian aid workers worldwide".

Action Against Hunger
Action Against Hunger, the non-governmental organization (NGO) for whom the victims worked, termed it a war crime.

Investigation
In September 2006, under increasing pressure from the international community to investigate this incident, Sri Lanka President Mahinda Rajapakse announced the formation of a Commission of Inquiry with a mandate to look into 15 specified alleged violations, including the Muttur massacre of ACF staff. With the dubious track record of previous Commissions of Inquiry in mind, a group of bilateral donors negotiated for the formation of a group of International Independent Eminent Persons (IIGEP) that, invited by the president, have the mandate to observe the investigations of the Commission of Inquiry. Australia nominated an Eminent Person (EP).

UTHR Report
On 1 April 2008, the organisation University Teachers for Human Rights (UTHR), which is run by former teachers at the University of Jaffnaknown to be openly critical both of the LTTE and the Government of Sri Lankareleased their "Special Report #30", which exclusively deals with the massacre of ACF staff.  UTHR names one member of the Sri Lankan Home Guardnow the Civil Defence Forceand two Police Constables based in the Muthur Police Station as perpetrators, but adds that several Sri Lanka Navy Special Forces were part of the group that entered the ACF compound and remained passive as the ACF staff were murdered.

References

External links
 World concern worker shot dead
  BBC report on the murder of fishermen
 BBC, Military killed aid staff
 ICJ report on Muttur massacre
 IIEG public statement 2007
 Aid agency concerned about the investigation

2006 crimes in Sri Lanka
Attacks on civilians attributed to the Sri Lanka Civil Security Force
Attacks on civilians attributed to the Sri Lanka Police
Massacres in Sri Lanka
Mass murder in 2006
Mass murder of Sri Lankan Muslims
Mass murder of Sri Lankan Tamils
People shot dead by law enforcement officers in Sri Lanka
Sri Lankan government forces attacks in Eelam War IV
August 2006 events in Asia
Terrorist incidents in Sri Lanka in 2006